Petkoff is a surname. Notable people with the surname include:

Damián Petkoff (born 1990), Argentine footballer
Drew Petkoff (born 1985), Canadian lacrosse player
Robert Petkoff (born 1963), American actor
Teodoro Petkoff (1932–2018), Venezuelan politician, guerrilla, economist, and journalist